Adevărul (meaning "The Truth") is a Moldovan daily newspaper, based in Chișinău founded in December 2010.

References

External links
  "Adevărul", entry in Cronologia della letteratura rumena moderna (1780-1914) database, at the University of Florence's Department of Neo-Latin Languages and Literatures

Newspapers established in 2010
Newspapers published in Moldova
Romanian-language newspapers
Adevărul
Mass media in Chișinău
2010 establishments in Moldova